Casa Grande is a town in Northern Peru, capital of the district of Casa Grande of Ascope Province in the region La Libertad. This town is located beside the Pan-American Highway some 48 km north of Trujillo city in the agricultural Chicama Valley.

See also
Paiján culture
Ascope Province
Chavimochic
Virú Valley
Virú
Moche valley

External links
Location of Casa Grande by Wikimapia

References

   

Populated places in La Libertad Region